Avenham Park is a public park in Avenham, close to the centre of Preston in Lancashire in the northwest of England, and managed by Preston City Council.

The park is located in Preston's Conservation area and leads down to the banks of the River Ribble. It was designed and built in the 1860s.

Overview
As an Historic England Grade II* listed park, it features a number of historical structures such as The Belvedere, The Swiss Chalet, The Boer War Memorial and Riverside Walk. The park is one of two city centre Victorian parks in Preston, the other being its neighbour - Miller Park. The two parks are separated by the East Lancashire Railway embankment and access is through the Ivy Bridge and along Riverside Walk. The East Lancashire Railway line closed in the 1970s although the viaduct across the river, which is a Grade II listed building, remains.

The park was designed by Edward Milner as a "harmonious whole" including the adjacent Miller Park. The park includes long open lawn areas and hosts a number of annual events throughout the year. Most notable among its many features is the Japanese garden or Rock Garden, which was added in the 1930s when this type of design became fashionable.

Another major feature of the park is The Belvedere, a pavilion on high ground at the northeastern corner of the park, overlooking the main park and river. It was originally located in Miller Park but was moved to make way for the statue of the Earl of Derby. The Belvedere is known locally as the "White House" or the "Light House".

A path on the northern edge of the park follows the route of the Old Tram Road, which used to link the northern and southern parts of the Lancaster Canal. The path descends an incline to the River Ribble. On the site of the current Belvedere was once a stationary steam engine that hauled waggons up the hill. The path crosses the river on a concrete footbridge built in the 1960s on the site of the original tramway trestle bridge. The modern bridge has been built in the same style as the original wooden structure.

The field in the centre of the park has a gentle slope towards the river, and acts as a natural amphitheatre. The original Victorian Bandstand was demolished and replaced with a brick and concrete stage during the 1950s to enable the area to be used for concerts. This construction had surprisingly good acoustic qualities but fell into disuse and was demolished in March 2006, although the Park is still used for many local and regional annual events. These include Preston's Mela, which celebrates the culture of the city's large Asian community and on Easter Monday children have traditionally rolled decorated eggs down its grassy slopes since Victorian times. Bands and musicians such as Oasis, The Spice Girls, Natasha Bedingfield, Sushi, Mark Owen, and Labyrinth have also performed in Avenham Park in more recent years.

In general, the layout of the park is little changed from when the park was first laid out. An 1889 map  still provides an accurate representation of the park today.

The inauguration of the park
Preston's Avenham Park, Moor Park and Miller Park were inaugurated on the same day that the former Town Hall was opened in 1867. On September 28, 1867 the Preston Chronicle commented that the preparations were in place and that the expectation was that "…….we shall have a gayer, a busier, and a more bustling town than we have had on any previous occasion, excepting, perhaps, at some of our Guilds". The following week's edition for October 5, 1887 devoted several columns to "The Opening of the New Town Hall and Inauguration of the Parks". It was a civic event of considerable size and importance and when the opening ceremony for the town hall was concluded a procession was formed which made its way to Avenham and Miller Parks. Schoolchildren from across Preston had gathered in the parks and it was estimated that 23000 -25000 were in present. The Duke of Cambridge, cousin of Queen Victoria, was in attendance and the band of the Third Royal Lancashire Militia entertained the crowds.

Recent developments
As part of a multi-million pound Heritage Lottery-funded restoration project, both Avenham and Miller Parks have undergone a facelift over the last few years. The refurbishment, which is nearing completion, included restoration of all of the historical features (including The Belvedere, The Boer War Memorial etc.), improved lighting and footpaths, vehicle controls and a new Pavilion incorporating a café, better public toilets and a police post and  acting as a base for dedicated park staff.

These improvements are intended to make the park cleaner and safer, and provide more events and activities for the people of Preston.

The old stage, which was removed in early 2006, was replaced by a small performance area and facilities to install temporary concert stages like those used at music festivals throughout the country.

An architectural design competition was launched by RIBA Competitions and McChesney Architects were chosen by Preston City Council and in September 2008 the new Pavilion, with its cafe, opened. A programme of public lunchtime walks has been scheduled and the function room may also be booked. Attractive new lamps have been installed on the pathways leading to the Pavilion. The Japanese garden has also been restored and improved.

As part of the refurbishment, the path along the railway embankment and the viaduct was widened and given a hard surface. The Council intends to open this path onto the Fishergate Centre car park, to allow direct pedestrian and cycle access from the railway.

In April 2015 an unexploded military mortar bomb was discovered by metal detectorists near the park. An area close to the Old Tram Bridge was cordoned off.

In February 2019, the tram bridge was closed when an inspection revealed cracks putting the bridge at risk of collapse.

See also
Miller Park

References

External links
 Official Website
 VisitPreston.com

Parks and commons in Preston
Grade II* listed parks and gardens in Lancashire